Nicholas Alexander Simmons (Born December 18, 1999), known professionally as YBN Nahmir, is an American rapper. He is best known for his singles "Rubbin Off the Paint" which charted at number 46 on the Billboard Hot 100 chart, "Bounce Out with That", which peaked at number one on the Bubbling Under Hot 100 Singles chart, and "Opp Stoppa" (solo and/or with 21 Savage on the remix) which peaked at number 78 on the Billboard Hot 100 chart.

Early life 
Simmons was born on December 18, 1999, in Birmingham, Alabama. He was raised in a home with his mother, his cousins and his aunt. Simmons attended Clay-Chalkville High School in Clay, Alabama, though dropped out following the success of "Rubbin Off the Paint;" he graduated in May 2018.

Simmons' interest in music started when he was fourteen years old and was gifted an Xbox 360 for Christmas. Simmons began to play the video game Rock Band (which he would later use to record his first song.) and eventually moved to playing Grand Theft Auto V and then started recording gameplay videos where he would generate a following on YouTube. During his time playing Grand Theft Auto V, Simmons would freestyle in Xbox Live parties and alongside numerous other friends, established the Young Boss Niggas collective.

Career 

Simmons formed the hip hop collective YBN (an acronym for Young Boss Niggas) in Birmingham, Alabama in 2014 composed by him, YBN Almighty Jay, YBN Cordae, YBN Glizzy, his cousin YBN Manny, YBN Walker, YBN Nicky Baandz, YBN Malik, YBN Carl and YBN Dayday.

Simmons uploaded his first song onto YouTube when he was fifteen with fellow YBN member, YBN Almighty Jay. The song, titled "Hood Mentality" was uploaded on March 21, 2015, to barely any reception. Simmons uploaded several more songs to YouTube before releasing his first mixtape on January 2, 2017, titled Believe In The Glo on SoundCloud. Simmons uploaded his second mixtape to SoundCloud on January 21, 2017.

Simmons released "Rubbin Off the Paint" on September 18, 2017, to WorldStarHipHop's YouTube channel. The song quickly went viral with Simmons explaining it as "blowing up overnight." After the success of the song, Simmons was pulled out of school due to his exceptional popularity and forced to start online classes. The song debuted at 79 on the Billboard Hot 100 and peaked at 46.

In November 2017, Simmons was involved in controversy following his song being claimed by a record label after his manager sold the instrumental for the song to a third-party. In response, Simmons now has an in-house producer for his instrumentals who is a member of the YBN collective. Simmons released six more tracks in 2017.

On January 23, 2018, Simmons released "Bounce Out with That" on Lyrical Lemonade's YouTube channel. The song wasn't available on streaming services for up to three days after the release of the music video. The song has accumulated over 159 million views on YouTube  after its release.

In April 2018, Simmons signed with Atlantic Records. He was later named as one of the members of XXL's "2018 Freshman Class" on June 12, 2018, competing in a cypher with Stefflon Don and Wifisfuneral.

On July 13, 2018, Simmons announced via Twitter he would do a Tour in Europe in the fall 2018 with Almighty Jay and Cordae. They would visit France, Germany, Poland, Sweden and more. The collective YBN released YBN: The Mixtape in 2018 with Gucci Mane, MGK and Lil Skies, between others.

On March 22, 2019, he released "Baby 8". On June 10, 2019, he released a music video called "Opp Stoppa".

On March 26, 2021, Simmons released his debut album Visionland.

On July 9, 2022, Simmons has confirmed to have signed a new recording deal with Def Jam Recordings, making him the second artist to draft instantly to the latter from Atlantic Records since Fabolous in 2006.

Musical style 
Nahmir lists his main influences as rappers from the San Francisco Bay Area such as E-40. Talking on his influences in an interview with Billboard, Simmons stated that the lack of mainstream rappers from Birmingham made him listen to more artists from the West Coast such as Eazy-E and Tupac.

Personal life 
Simmons currently resides in Los Angeles, California. In August 2018, he began a relationship with social media influencer Sahlt. In 2021, it was announced that the two had ended their relationship.

Discography

Studio albums

Extended Plays

Mixtapes

Singles

As lead artist

As featured artist

Notes

References

External links

 
 

Rappers from Alabama
Living people
African-American male rappers
1999 births
Musicians from Birmingham, Alabama
Atlantic Records artists
21st-century American rappers
21st-century American male musicians
Twitch (service) streamers
21st-century African-American musicians
People from Clay, Alabama
Songwriters from Alabama
Gangsta rappers
Trap musicians
Def Jam Recordings artists